Buckelew Mansion, also known as Lakeview, is a historic home in Jamesburg, Middlesex County, New Jersey, United States. It now serves as a museum of local history and the headquarters of the Jamesburg Historical Association.

History
A single room at its creation in 1685, the residence expanded over following centuries to become the 23 room mansion it is today. The single-story structure became two during the ownership of James Buckelow, who took up residence with his new wife in 1829 and expanded the house to accommodate his growing family and reflect his community prestige. A third story was added during the 1870s.

The mansion was listed on the New Jersey Register of Historic Places and National Register of Historic Places in 1979 as the Ensley-Mount-Buckalew House.

See also
List of the oldest buildings in New Jersey
National Register of Historic Places listings in Middlesex County, New Jersey

References

External links
 Jamesburg Historical Association

Houses on the National Register of Historic Places in New Jersey
Historic house museums in New Jersey
Museums in Middlesex County, New Jersey
Houses in Middlesex County, New Jersey
Houses completed in 1685
National Register of Historic Places in Middlesex County, New Jersey
New Jersey Register of Historic Places
1685 establishments in New Jersey
Jamesburg, New Jersey